The Helicopter Museum in Weston-super-Mare, North Somerset, England, is a museum featuring a collection of more than 80 helicopters and autogyros from around the world, both civilian and military. It is based at the southeastern corner of the former Weston-super-Mare Airport.

History
The museum originated in 1958 when its founder, aviation writer and historian Elfan ap Rees, began to build up a private collection of rotorcraft documentation and artefacts. Over the next ten years his collection grew and in 1969 he acquired his first complete helicopter, a Bristol Sycamore Mk.3.

In 1974, ap Rees purchased a Bristol Belvedere and formed a volunteer group to restore it. In December 1976, an ex Royal Navy Westland Whirlwind HAS Mk.7 was acquired and added to the collection. In 1977 and 1978, more aircraft were added, including an ex Royal Air Force Bristol Sycamore HC Mk.14 and several rare prototypes: the Fairey Ultra-Light tip-jet driven helicopter, the Thruxton Gadfly HDW.1 two-seat autogyro and the Campbell Cougar autogyro.

In 1978, the museum acquired a small area and some buildings on Weston-super-Mare airfield, including a Second World War armoury building and air-raid shelter. The buildings required extensive repair work, but by the summer of 1978 the collection was opened to the public, with nine aircraft and a range of other artefacts on display. The museum was forced to close at the end of the 1979 season, but throughout the 1980s, remains from rare helicopters were added to the collection, often preventing them from being scrapped, including the only remaining major parts of the Fairey Rotodyne. Other aircraft acquired in the 1980s included two more variants of the Westland Whirlwind, a Westland Scout AH Mk.1 and a Westland Wessex.

The museum reopened on a new airfield site in 1988 and volunteers spent the next year restoring old buildings and erecting a new display annexe. On 3 November 1989, the museum was officially opened by Prince Andrew, Duke of York, who arrived in a Wessex HC.4 of the Queen's Flight. Since then the museum has grown substantially, erecting new hangarage to put the collection under cover and purchasing its 4.5-acre site outright, with the help of the Heritage Lottery Fund and other grants.

Throughout its development, the trustees have been led by ap Rees, who has also been responsible for sourcing and acquiring many rare aircraft for the collection. By 2012, some 45 helicopters and autogyros in the museum qualified for the highest benchmark status in the National Aviation Heritage Register, including a number of sole prototypes and others that were the only examples in the country. The museum continues to restore and display many types of helicopters from various countries and purposes.

Collection

The museum's collection of helicopters exceeds 80 complete rotorcraft, with others under restoration or only partly complete. The museum features many foreign helicopters, particularly Soviet-era and Eastern European craft, for example the Kamov Ka-26 Hoodlum and the Mi-24 Hind, and more modern ones such as the EH-101.

In 2008, several parts of the Boeing Vertol XCH-62, prototype of the largest helicopter ever built in the western countries, were sent to the Helicopter Museum to be exhibited there. The XCH-62 was scrapped in 2005 at the United States Army Aviation Museum, where it was previously displayed. More recently the museum has added a Mil Mi-8, a former Italian Guardia di Finanza Agusta A109, an Agusta Bell 206C JetRanger, a Gyrodyne QH-50D, a Super Puma and a Piasecki H-21. The museum also holds two record-breakers: Westland Lynx G-LYNX which has held the absolute helicopter world speed record since 1986, and the first production Aerospatiale Dauphin which holds the Paris-London-Paris city centres speed record.

Rotorcraft undergoing restoration

 Bristol Belvedere HC.1, XG452
 Bristol Type 171 Sycamore Mk.3, G-ALSX
 Bristol Type 171 Sycamore HC.14, XL829
 Fairey Ultra-Light, G-AOUJ/XJ928
 Westland Wessex 60, G-AVNE
 Westland Whirlwind HCC.12, XR486

Rotorcraft

British
Source.

Western European
Source.

Eastern European
Source.

American
Source.

Expansion
The museum site has expanded to include the former Weston Airport control tower and the attached "pilots' building" reopened in 2018, and cleared an area ready for a new services block.

See also
American Helicopter Museum, Pennsylvania, USA
Classic Rotors Museum, California, USA
Hubschraubermuseum Bückeburg, Germany
Related lists
List of aerospace museums

References

Notes

Citations

External links

 
 Friends of The Helicopter Museum

Aerospace museums in England
Military aviation museums in England
Museums established in 1958
Museums in Somerset
Buildings and structures in Weston-super-Mare
Mus
1958 establishments in England